Olearia bullata is a small divaricating shrub endemic to New Zealand, from the plant family Asteraceae. It has small brownish green leaves with a large amount of interlacing twigs, and grows to approximately 3 metres in height.

References

bullata
Divaricating plants